Kenneth Rudd (born 16 May 1968) is a British biathlete. He competed at the 1992 Winter Olympics and the 1994 Winter Olympics.

References

External links
 

1968 births
Living people
British male biathletes
Olympic biathletes of Great Britain
Biathletes at the 1992 Winter Olympics
Biathletes at the 1994 Winter Olympics
Sportspeople from North Yorkshire